The 1988 American South Conference men's basketball tournament was held March 4–6 at the Montagne Center at Lamar University in Beaumont, Texas. This was the inaugural edition of the tournament after the league's establishment in 1987.

 defeated  in the championship game, 69–66, to take home the first American South men's basketball tournament.

The Bulldogs, however, did not receive an automatic invitation to the 1988 NCAA Tournament. They ultimately participated in the 1988 NIT.

Format
All six of the conference's founding members participated in the tournament field. They were seeded based on regular season conference records. The top two teams were given byes into the semifinals while the bottom four teams were placed and paired into the initial quarterfinal round.

All games were played at Lamar's home court at the Montagne Center in Beaumont, Texas.

Bracket

References

American South Conference men's basketball tournament
1987–88 American South Conference men's basketball season
1988 in sports in Texas